IHF World Handball Championship may refer to

Indoor handball
 IHF World Men's Handball Championship
 IHF World Women's Handball Championship
 IHF Men's Junior World Championship
 IHF Women's Junior World Championship
 IHF Men's Youth World Championship
 IHF Women's Youth World Championship
 (World University Handball Championship) Not from the IHF

Beach handball
 Beach Handball World Championships

Field/Outdoor handball
 IHF World Men's Outdoor Handball Championship
 IHF World Women's Outdoor Handball Championship

es:Campeonato Mundial de Balonmano